The Xylodisculidae is a taxonomic family of sea snails, marine gastropod mollusks in the informal group Lower Heterobranchia.

Genera
 Xylodiscula B. A. Marshall, 1988

References 

 The Taxonomicon
 Haszprunar G., Speimann E., Hawe A. & Hess M. (2011) Interactive 3D anatomy and affinities of the Hyalogyrinidae, basal Heterobranchia (Gastropoda) with a rhipidoglossate radula. Organisms, Diversity & Evolution 11(3): 231-236.